Vachi is a rural locality (a selo) and the administrative center of Kulinsky District of the Republic of Dagestan, Russia. Population:  The population is predominantly Lak.

History
It was founded about 1,500 years ago, and was perhaps named after King Vache of Caucasian Albania. Vachi was famous for talented artisans: shoemakers, tailors, tinsmith, blacksmith who traveled to the lowlands of Dagestan and other regions of the Caucasus. In 1926, an elementary school opened in Vachi.

Miscellaneous
Dialing code: +7 87268.

References

External links
Official website of Kulinsky District. History of Vachi 

Rural localities in Kulinsky District
Laks (Caucasus)